Piet De Jongh (born 15 November 1934) is a Dutch racing cyclist. He rode in the 1957 Tour de France.

References

1934 births
Living people
Dutch male cyclists
Place of birth missing (living people)
20th-century Dutch people